Miaphysitism is the Christological doctrine that holds Jesus, the "Incarnate Word, is fully divine and fully human, in one 'nature' (physis)." It is a position held by the Oriental Orthodox Churches and differs from the Chalcedonian position that Jesus is one "person" in two "natures", a divine nature and a human nature (Dyophysitism).

While historically a major point of controversy within Christianity, several modern declarations by both Chalcedonian and Miaphysite churches state that the difference between the two Christological formulations does not reflect any significant difference in belief about the nature of Christ.

Terminology 
The word miaphysite derives from the Ancient Greek μία (mía, "one") plus φύσις (phúsis, "nature, substance"). Miaphysite teaching is based on Cyril of Alexandria's formula μία φύσις τοῦ θεοῦ λόγου σεσαρκωμένη, meaning "one physis of the Word of God made flesh" (or "... of God the Word made flesh").

The 451 Council of Chalcedon used physis to mean "nature" (as in "divine nature" and "human nature"), and defined that there was in Jesus one hypostasis (person) but two physeis (natures). It is disputed whether Cyril used physis in that sense. John Anthony McGuckin says that in Cyril's formula "physis serves as a rough semantic equivalent to hypostasis".

Others interpret the Miaphysite term physis in line with its use by the Council of Chalcedon and speak of "Miaphysitism" as "Monophysitism", a word used of all forms of denial of the Chalcedonian doctrine. However, they add that "Miaphysitism" is "the more accurate term for the position held by the Syriac, Coptic and Armenian churches".

The Second Council of Constantinople (553), the ecumenical council that followed that of Chalcedon, accepted Cyril's phrase, but warned against misinterpreting it.

The broad term "Dyophysitism" covers not only the Chalcedonian teaching but also what Nestorianism interpreted as meaning that Jesus is not only of two natures but is in fact two centres of attribution, and thus two persons, a view condemned by the Council of Chalcedon. Similarly, "Monophysitism" covers not only Oriental Orthodox teaching but also the view called Eutychianism, according to which, after the union of the divine and human natures in the incarnation of the eternal Son or Word of God, he has only a single "nature", a synthesis of divine and human, identical with neither. This doctrine the Miaphysites reject, teaching instead that the incarnate Christ has one "nature", but one that is still of both a divine character and a human character and retains all the characteristics of both, with no mingling, confusion (pouring together) or change of either nature.

To avoid being confused with Eutychians, the Oriental Orthodox Churches reject the label "Monophysite". Coptic Metropolitan Bishop of Damiette declared it a misnomer to call them Monophysites, for "they always confessed the continuity of existence of the two natures in the one incarnate nature of the Word of God. Non[e] of the natures ceased to exist because of the union and the term 'Mia Physis' denoting the incarnate nature is completely different from the term 'Monophysites'. [...] The Oriental Orthodox do not believe in a single nature in Jesus Christ but rather a united divine-human nature."

The Agreed Statement by the Anglican–Oriental Orthodox International Commission in 2014 said:

Conflict 

The conflict over terminology was to some extent a conflict between two renowned theological schools. The Catechetical School of Alexandria focused on the divinity of Christ as the Logos or Word of God and thereby risked leaving his real humanity out of proper consideration (cf. Apollinarism). The stress by the School of Antioch was on the humanity of Jesus as a historical figure. To the theological rivalry between the two schools was added a certain political competitiveness between, on the one hand, Alexandria and, on the other, Antioch and Constantinople.

The condemnation of Nestorius at the Council of Ephesus in 431 was a victory for the Alexandrian school and church, but its acceptance required a compromise, the "Formula of Reunion", entered into by Cyril of Alexandria and John of Antioch two years later. Cyril died in 444. Under his successor, Dioscurus I of Alexandria, a Constantinopole-based archimandrite named Eutyches, whose answer to questions put to him was judged heretical by Bishop Flavian of Constantinople, in turn, accused Flavian of heresy. The Emperor convoked a council and entrusted its presidency to Dioscurus. This Second Council of Ephesus, held in 449, rehabilitated Eutyches and condemned and deposed Flavian and some other bishops. These appealed to Pope Leo I, who, calling their assembly not a concilium but a latrocinium, a robber council rather than a proper council, declared it null and void. The Miaphysite Churches still recognize it as valid, but outside their ranks it is not reckoned as an ecumenical council.

The Council of Chalcedon was held in 451 and annulled the earlier council that had been presided over by Dioscurus. It has not been accepted by the Oriental Orthodox Churches, who do not defend Eutyches and accept the implicit condemnation of him by the (non-ecumenical) Third Council of Ephesus held in 475.

The council accepted by acclamation Leo's Tome, the letter by Pope Leo I setting out, as he saw it, the church's doctrine on the matter, and issued what has been called the Chalcedonian Definition, of which the part that directly concerns Miaphysitism runs as follows:

Dissent from this definition did not at first lead to a clean break between what are now the Eastern Orthodox Church and the Oriental Orthodox Churches. While in the West, Rome tended to uphold steadfastly the text of Leo's Tome and of the Chalcedonian definition, the situation in the East was fluid for a century after the council, with compromise formulas imposed by the emperors and accepted by the church and leading at times to schisms between East and West (cf. Acacian Schism, Henotikon, Monoenergism).

The situation then hardened into a fixed division between what are now called the Oriental Orthodox Churches and the Chalcedonian churches later divided into the Eastern Orthodox Church and the Catholic Church and its Protestant derivations.

Thoughts of resolution 
In recent decades a number of Christological agreements between Miaphysite and Chalcedonian churches have been signed not just by theologians but by heads of churches. They explicitly distinguish the divinity and the humanity of Christ, without necessarily using the phrase "two natures".

On 20 May 1973, Pope Shenouda III of Alexandria and Pope Paul VI jointly declared:

At that meeting they decided to set up an official theological dialogue between the two churches. On 12 February 1988 the commission that carried on that dialogue signed "a common formula expressing our official agreement on Christology which was already approved by the Holy Synod of the Coptic Orthodox Church on 21 June 1986". The brief common formula was as follows:

A "Doctrinal Agreement on Christology" was signed on 3 June 1990 by Baselios Mar Thoma Mathews I, Catholicos of the Malankara Orthodox Syrian Church and Pope John Paul II, in which they explicitly spoke of "divine and human natures":

Similar accords were signed by the head of the Catholic Church and the heads of the Syriac Orthodox Church and the Armenian Apostolic Church.

Although unofficial dialogue between individual theologians of the (Eastern) Orthodox and the Oriental Orthodox began in 1964, official dialogue did not begin until 1985; but already by 1989 an agreement was reached on the Christological dogma, stating that the word physis in Cyril of Alexandria's formula referred to the hypostasis of Christ, one of the three hypostaseis or prosopa (persons) of the Trinity, who has "become incarnate of the Holy Spirit and Blessed Virgin Mary Theotokos, and thus became man, consubstantial with us in His humanity but without sin. He is true God and true Man at the same time, perfect in his Divinity, perfect in His humanity. Because the one she bore in her womb was at the same time fully God as well as fully human we call the Blessed Virgin Theotokos. When we speak of the one composite hypostasis of our Lord Jesus Christ, we do not say that in Him, a divine hypostasis and a human hypostasis came together. It is that the one eternal hypostasis of the Second Person of the Trinity has assumed our created human nature in that act uniting it with His own uncreated divine nature, to form an inseparably and unconfusedly united real divine-human being, the natures being distinguished from each other in contemplation only."

A second Agreed Statement was published in the following year 1990 declaring:

Implementation of the recommendations of these two Agreed Statements would mean restoration of full communion between the Eastern Orthodox and the Oriental Orthodox Churches, but as of 2021 they have not been put into effect. Of the Eastern Orthodox churches, only the patriarchates of Alexandria, Antioch and Romania have accepted the Statements, as have the Coptic, Syriac and Malankara Churches on the Oriental Orthodox side. The Russian patriarchate has asked for clarification of some points. The monastic community of Mount Athos rejects any form of dialogue. Others have taken no active interest.

References

Further reading 

 
 
 Davis, Leo Donald, The First Seven Ecumenical Councils (325-787) Their History and Theology, 1983 (Michael Glazier, Wilmington DE), reprinted 1990 (Liturgical Press, Collegeville MN, Theology and Life Series 21, 342 pp.), chaps. 4-6, pp. 134–257.
 
 
 
 
 
 
 
 
 

Christian terminology
Christianity in the Byzantine Empire
Christianity in the Middle East
Eastern Orthodox theology
Heresy in Christianity
Oriental Orthodox theology
Schisms in Christianity
Nature of Jesus Christ